Barntalloch Castle was a castle located at Staplegorton, in Dumfries and Galloway, Scotland.

The castle was built in the 12th century by Galfrid de Coninsburgh and later was a stronghold of the Lindsay family. It was the caput of the Barony of Staplegorton.

References
Coventry, Martin. Castles of the Clans: the strongholds and seats of 750 Scottish families and clans. Musselburgh, 2008.
CANMORE - Barntalloch Castle

Castles in Dumfries and Galloway
Listed castles in Scotland
Clan Lindsay